Maikona is a genus of moths of the family Noctuidae erected by Shōnen Matsumura in 1928.

Species
Maikona jezoensis Matsumura, 1928 Japan
Maikona nanlingensis Owada & Wang, 2003 Guangdong
Maikona yazakii Kishida, 1987 Taiwan

References
Matsumura, S. (1928). "A new Agaristid-Moth". Insecta Matsumurana. 2 (3): 126–127.

Agaristinae
Taxa named by Shōnen Matsumura